Calpain-9 is a protein that in humans is encoded by the CAPN9 gene.

Calpains are ubiquitous, well-conserved family of calcium-dependent, cysteine proteases. The calpain proteins are heterodimers consisting of an invariant small subunit and variable large subunits. The large subunit possesses a cysteine protease domain, and both subunits possess calcium-binding domains. Calpains have been implicated in neurodegenerative processes, as their activation can be triggered by calcium influx and oxidative stress. The protein encoded by this gene is expressed predominantly in stomach and small intestine and may have specialized functions in the digestive tract. This gene is thought to be associated with gastric cancer. Multiple alternatively spliced transcript variants encoding different isoforms have been found for this gene.

References

Further reading

External links
 
 The MEROPS online database for peptidases and their inhibitors: C02.006
 

EF-hand-containing proteins